Cottonwood could refer to these places in the United States state of Texas:
Cottonwood, Callahan County, Texas
Cottonwood, Kaufman County, Texas
Cottonwood, Somervell County, Texas
Cottonwood, Madison County, Texas